Sheila Sorensen (born September 20, 1947) is an American politician who served in the Idaho House of Representatives from the 21st district from 1987 to 1992 and in the Idaho Senate from 1992 to 2004.

Elections

Idaho First Congressional District

2006 
Sorensen took third in the Republican primary to replace Butch Otter as Idaho Congressman from District 1 taking only 18.3% losing to Bill Sali.

Idaho Senate District 18

2002 
Sorensen was unopposed in the Republican primary. Sorensen defeated Independent candidate Robert McMinn with 67.9% of the vote in the general election.

Idaho Senate District 13

2000 
Sorensen was unopposed in the Republican primary and the general election.

1998 
Sorensen defeated David Baumann in the Republican primary with 61.8% of the vote. Sorensen was unopposed for the general election.

1996 
Sorensen was unopposed in the Republican primary. Sorensen defeated Democratic nominee Penny Fletcher with 66.8% of the vote in the general election.

1994 
Sorensen was unopposed in the Republican primary. Sorensen defeated Democratic nominee Marilyn Sword with 58.4% of the vote in the general election.

1992 
Sorensen defeated Irene Baumann in the Republican primary. Sorensen defeated Democratic nominee Kelly Buckland in the general election.

Idaho House of Representatives District 21 Seat B

1990 
Sorensen was unopposed in the Republican primary. Sorensen defeated Democratic nominee Judith Hagan in the general election.

References 

1947 births
Living people
Republican Party members of the Idaho House of Representatives
Republican Party Idaho state senators
Women state legislators in Idaho
Politicians from Chicago
21st-century American women